Today We Are All Demons is an album by the American aggrotech band Combichrist. The album is available in both one disc and two disc versions. A remixed version (Beneath the World Mix) of the title track can be found on the Underworld film soundtrack.

Track listing
All songs written by Andy LaPlegua. 

-If the hidden track is played in mono, it will reveal a female computerized voice mocking the listener for still using mono instead of stereo

Track listing Dark Side CD

Samples 
 "Scarred" opening line "You ever get the feeling that everything in America is completely fucked up?" comes from the american 1990 comedy-drama movie Pump Up The Volume and is spoken by main character Mark Hunter, played by Christian Slater.

References

External links
  from Out Of Line Music

2009 albums
Combichrist albums